Atlas , designation 27 Tauri, is a triple star system in the constellation of Taurus. It is a member of the Pleiades, an open star cluster (M45). It is 431 light-years (132 parsecs) away, and is 3.92 degrees north of the ecliptic.

Nomenclature
27 Tauri is the star's Flamsteed designation.

In 2016 the International Astronomical Union organized a Working Group on Star Names (WGSN) to catalogue and standardize proper names for stars. The WGSN approved the name Atlas for this star on 21 August 2016 and it is now so entered in the IAU Catalog of Star Names.

Mythology

Atlas was a Titan and the father of the Pleiades sisters in Greek mythology.

Properties
Atlas is a triple star system, with the inner pair orbiting in under a year and the outer star orbiting in 260 years. It is too close to have been assigned a spectral class, but has an apparent magnitude of 6.8, three magnitudes fainter than the combined magnitude of the closer pair. Its mass is estimate to be twice that of the Sun.

At an inclination of 108°, it is not thought to show eclipses. Although the two stars cannot be resolved, the primary, component Aa1, is calculated to be 1.6 magnitudes brighter than the secondary, component Aa2.

Low amplitude variability of the brightness of Atlas was tentatively detected in observations by STEREO and clearly detected by Kepler/K2. The light curve varies with several periods, the most prominent being 2.427, 0.7457 and 1.214 days.

References

External links

 Alcyone ephemeris

B-type giants
Tauri, 027
Pleiades Open Cluster
Taurus (constellation)
Binary stars
Suspected variables
Atlas
Durchmusterung objects
1178
023850
017847